Anais Oyembo (born 30 June 1980) is a former Gabonese sprinter who competed in the Women's 100 Metres at the 2000 Summer Olympics. She achieved a time of 12:19 for 7th, but not enough to advance.

Career 
Anais Oyembo won 7th place of her qualifying heat in the 2000 Summer Olympics.

References

1980 births
Olympic athletes of Gabon
Gabonese female sprinters
Athletes (track and field) at the 2000 Summer Olympics
Living people
Olympic female sprinters
21st-century Gabonese people